Donald Myrick (April 6, 1940 – July 30, 1993) was an American saxophonist. A member of The Phenix Horns, he is best known for his work with Earth, Wind & Fire and Phil Collins.

He played alto, tenor, and soprano sax as a member of Earth, Wind & Fire's original horn section, Phenix Horns, from 1975 through 1982. Previously, Myrick had been a member of the musical group The Pharaohs. Myrick is also credited as a founding member of the Association for the Advancement of Creative Musicians (AACM)

Some of his most famous saxophone solos include Phil Collins' "All of My Life", "If Leaving Me Is Easy", and "One More Night", the latter featuring Myrick performing the sax solo in the official music video, filmed in a London pub. Another was the live recording of "Reasons", featured on the Earth Wind & Fire Gratitude album, and "After the Love Has Gone", from the album I Am. He performed with many prominent musicians, including Grover Washington, Jr. and Carlos Santana. Myrick appeared on records by artists including Bobby "Blue" Bland, The Dells, Regina Belle, the Mighty Clouds of Joy, and Heaven 17.

Earth, Wind & Fire's single "Runnin'" earned him the 1977/78 Grammy Award for Best R&B Instrumental.

Early life
Myrick attended Crane Junior College in Chicago, Illinois, where he was part of a band called The Jazzmen with Louis Satterfield, who later joined him in the Phenix Horns, performing with Earth, Wind & Fire. Myrick and Satterfield played in The Pharaohs, with musicians from Chess Records, which included drummer Maurice White, who went on to found Earth, Wind & Fire.

Death

Myrick was killed in Los Angeles, California by a Santa Monica police officer during a narcotics investigation. While attempting to serve a search warrant, police officer Gary Barbaro mistook a butane lighter in Myrick's hand for a weapon. He fired a single bullet that hit Myrick in the chest. Myrick died in the hospital shortly afterward, aged 53.

Following a funeral service at a Baptist church, his body was buried at Inglewood Park Cemetery in Los Angeles County.

Myrick was survived by his mother, Antoinette Myrick-Carr (now deceased), wife Barbara (now deceased), and three daughters: Shani, Lauren, Shirika Myrick, as well as a cousin, Elliot Myrick. In 1995, their wrongful death lawsuit against the city was settled for $400,000.

The song "For a Friend" by Phil Collins, released on the CD single "We Wait and We Wonder" in 1993, was a tribute to Myrick, who actively participated in Collins's songs and shows for many years.

As a tribute, Gary Bias performs the saxophone solos that originated with Myrick at Earth, Wind & Fire's live shows.

Discography
 With Howlin' Wolf
 The Howlin' Wolf Album (1969)

 With Philip Cohran & The Artistic Heritage Ensemble
 The Malcolm X Memorial (A Tribute in Music) (1970)

 With Donny Hathaway
 Everything Is Everything (1970)

 With Odell Brown
 Free Delivery (1970)

 With the Intentions 
 Dig It / Blowing with the Wind – Single (1971)

 With Jack McDuff
 The Heatin' System (1972)

 With Terry Callier
 What Colour Is Love (1972)
 I Just Can't Help Myself (1973)

 With Charles Bevel
 Meet "Mississippi Charles" Bevel (1973)

 With Penny Goodwin
 Portrait of a Gemini (1974)

 With Ramsey Lewis
 Sun Goddess (1974)

 With Earth, Wind & Fire
 That's the Way of the World (1975)
 Gratitude (1975)
 Spirit (1976)
 All 'n All (1977)
 I Am (1979)
 Faces (1980)
 Raise! (1981)
 Powerlight (1983)
 The Eternal Dance (1992) – Compilation 3-CD boxset.
 The Essential Earth, Wind & Fire (2002) - Compilation
 Live in Rio (2002)
 The Essential Plus (2004) – Compilation 2 CD + DVD
 The Essential Earth, Wind & Fire (2008) – 3-CD Compilation limited edition

 With The Emotions
 Flowers (1976)
 Rejoice! (1977)
 Sunbeam (1978)
 Come Into Our World (1979)
 New Affair (1981)

 With Sky
 Sky (1979)

 With Phil Collins 
 Face Value ("Missed Again", "If Leaving Me Is Easy" 1981)
 Hello, I Must Be Going! ("I Cannot Believe It's True" 1982)
 Live at Perkins Palace (1983) – VHS video
 No Jacket Required ("One More Night", "Who Said I Would?", "Inside Out" 1985)
 No Ticket Required"" (1985) – VHS video
 ...But Seriously ("All of My Life" 1989)
 Serious Hits... Live! (1990)
 ...But Seriously, The Videos (1992) – VHS video
 ...Hits (1998)
 The Platinum Collection (2004) – 3-CD box set
 Love Songs: A Compilation... Old and New (2004)
 Hits Live 1990–1997 (2004) – DVD
 The Singles (2016)

 With Frida
 Something's Going On (1982) – Album produced by Phil Collins, with Daryl Stuermer, Mo Foster, The Phenix Horns, etc.

 With Philip Bailey
 The Wonders of His Love (1984) – Sax on I Will No Wise Cast You Out Chinese Wall (1984) – with Phil Collins, Nathan East, The Phenix Horns, etc.
 Chinese Wall / Inside Out (1988) – Double compilation album

 With Heaven 17
 How Men Are (1984)
 "This Is Mine" (1984) – Single
 Pleasure One (1986)

 With Shuybah
 Shuybah (1984)

 With France Gall
 Le Tour de France (1988)

 Various artists
 Knebworth (1990) – Plays with Phil Collins Band on Sussudio Live at Knebworth – Parts One, Two & Three (1990) – Plays with Phil Collins & The Serious Band on "In the Air Tonight" & "Sussudio" as well as with Genesis & The Serious Band on "Turn it on again Medley"
 El DeBarge – In the Storm'' (1991)  Plays on the tracks, "Cry (Musical Interlude)", "Love Me Tonight", and "You Know What I Like"

References

External links

 
 
 Phil Collins discography at Discogs

1940 births
1993 deaths
Musicians from Chicago
Malcolm X College alumni
African-American saxophonists
American male saxophonists
Deaths by firearm in California
African Americans shot dead by law enforcement officers in the United States
Burials at Inglewood Park Cemetery
20th-century American saxophonists
20th-century American male musicians
The Pharaohs members
20th-century African-American musicians